The Columbia Journal of Transnational Law is a law review edited and published by students at Columbia Law School. The journal publishes scholarly articles and student notes on issues of transnational law.

Ranking and Citations 
The Columbia Journal of Transnational Law is the second-highest-ranked and second-most-cited journal at Columbia Law School.

The journal has been cited by the Supreme Court of the United States, the First Circuit Court of Appeals, the Second Circuit Court of Appeals, and numerous other federal appellate and district courts.

History 
The Columbia Journal of Transnational Law was created by Wolfgang G. Friedmann and a group of Columbia law students belonging to the Columbia Society of International Law. The first volume, published in 1961 under the name the Bulletin of the Columbia Society of International Law, consisted of informal discussions of international legal questions. The second volume, published in 1963 under the title International Law Bulletin, adopted the tradition of the scholarly law review.

During its second decade, the journal expanded publication to three issues per year, experimented with themed issues, and published some of the early proceedings of the Friedmann Conference which is held annually at Columbia Law School. By the beginning of its third decade, the journal’s themed issues—entire issues dedicated to the examination of current international law problems—became regular publications. These topical issues have examined international taxation, international trade embargoes and boycotts, China’s legal development, sovereign debt rescheduling, socialist law and international satellite communications.

Organizational structure and staff 
The Columbia Journal of Transnational Law is published by The Columbia Journal of Transnational Law Association, Inc., a New York corporation. The corporation is overseen by a board of directors of 17 members. The journal is further assisted by a board of advisors consisting of 10 members. The 2019-2020 editorial staff for Volume 59 consists of 23 student editors and 42 staff members.

The Bulletin 
The Columbia Journal of Transnational Law also publishes the Bulletin, an online publication featuring student notes, legal updates, and interviews with legal scholars and practitioners.

Wolfgang Friedmann Memorial Award 
The Wolfgang Friedmann Memorial Award is presented annually to an individual who has made outstanding contributions to the field of transnational law. The award is given in memory of the journal’s founder, Wolfgang Friedmann. The recipient of the award is honored at the annual Wolfgang Friedmann Banquet.

References

American law journals
Triannual journals
Publications established in 1961
English-language journals
Columbia University academic journals